Salemgarh is a village in Hisar division in the state of Haryana, India. It is shares the same boundary with Bahadurpur.

References 

Villages in Hisar district